The following contains the names of the members of the 2004 South Carolina Gamecocks men's soccer team and the results of each match. The 2004 season was a successful one for Gamecock soccer that would include a berth in the NCAA Tournament, their 17th all-time. The team finished the season with a 12-7-1 record that included four wins over top-25 opponents. The 2004 roster was a star-studded one that included three future professionals; Brad Guzan, Mike Sambursky, and Josh Alcala.

Roster

Results

See also 
 South Carolina Gamecocks

References 

South Carolina Gamecocks men's soccer seasons
South Carolina Gamecocks
South Carolina Gamecocks
South Carolina Gamecocks, soccer men's
South Carolina